Bardal Church is a parish church of the Church of Norway in Leirfjord Municipality in Nordland county, Norway. It is located in the village of Bardalssjøen. It is one of the churches for the Leirfjord parish which is part of the Nord-Helgeland prosti (deanery) in the Diocese of Sør-Hålogaland. The white, wooden church was built in a long church style in 1887 using plans drawn up by the architect I. C. Olsen. The church seats about 250 people.

See also
List of churches in Sør-Hålogaland

References

Leirfjord
Churches in Nordland
Wooden churches in Norway
19th-century Church of Norway church buildings
Churches completed in 1887
1887 establishments in Norway
Long churches in Norway